The HAL HF-24 Marut ("Spirit of the Tempest") was an Indian fighter-bomber aircraft of the 1960s. Developed by Hindustan Aeronautics Limited (HAL), with Kurt Tank as lead designer. The Project Engineer from HAL was George William Benjamin. It is the first Indian-developed jet aircraft, and the first Asian jet fighter (outside Russia/Soviet Union) to go beyond the test phase and into successful production and active service. On 17 June 1961, the type conducted its maiden flight; on 1 April 1967, the first production Marut was officially delivered to the IAF.

While the Marut had been envisioned as a supersonic-capable combat aircraft, it would never manage to exceed Mach 1. This limitation was principally due to the engines used, which in turn had been limited by various political and economic factors; multiple attempts to develop improved engines or to source alternative powerplants were fruitless. The Marut's cost and lack of capability in comparison to contemporary aircraft were often criticised.

A total of 147 Maruts were manufactured, the majority for the Indian Air Force (IAF). While initially envisioned as a capable interceptor aircraft, it was primarily used for ground attack missions. In this role, the Marut saw combat during the Indo-Pakistani War of 1971, notably participating in the Battle of Longewala. By 1982, the Marut was increasingly obsolescent, and was gradually phased out during the late 1980s.

Design and development

Origins
During the 1950s, Hindustan Aircraft Limited (HAL) had developed and produced several types of trainer aircraft, such as the HAL HT-2. However, elements within the firm were eager to expand into the then-new realm of supersonic fighter aircraft. Around the same time, the Indian government was in the process of formulating a new Air Staff Requirement for a Mach 2-capable combat aircraft to equip the Indian Air Force (IAF). However, as HAL lacked the necessary experience in both developing and manufacturing frontline combat fighters, it was clear that external guidance would be invaluable; this assistance was embodied by Kurt Tank.

In 1956, HAL formally began design work on the supersonic fighter project. The Indian government, led by Jawaharlal Nehru, authorised the development of the aircraft, stating that it would aid in the development of a modern aircraft industry in India. The first phase of the project sought to develop an airframe suitable for travelling at supersonic speeds, and able to effectively perform combat missions as a fighter aircraft, while the second phase sought to domestically design and produce an engine capable of propelling the aircraft. Early on, there was an explicit adherence to satisfying the IAF's requirements for a capable fighter bomber; attributes such as a twin-engine configuration and a speed of Mach 1.4 to 1.5 were quickly emphasised.

During development, HAL designed and constructed a full-scale two-seat wooden glider to act as a flying demonstrator. Designated HAL X-241, this replicated production aircraft in terms of dimensions, control configuration, and aerofoil sections. The wheel brakes, air brakes, flaps, and retractable undercarriage were all actuated using compressed gas, with sufficient gas storage aboard for multiple actuations per flight. On 3 April 1959, the X-241 flew for the first time, having been launched by aero-tow behind a Douglas Dakota Mk.IV BJ 449. A total of 86 flights were conducted prior to the X-241 receiving considerable damage as the result of a landing accident, after the nose undercarriage failed to extend.

On 24 June 1961, the first prototype Marut conducted its maiden flight. It was powered by the same Bristol Siddeley Orpheus 703 turbojets that had powered the Folland Gnat, also being manufactured by HAL at that time. On 1 April 1967, the first production Marut was delivered to the IAF. While originally intended only as an interim measure during testing, HAL decided to power production Maruts with a pair of unreheated Orpheus 703s, meaning the aircraft could not attain supersonic speed. Although originally conceived to operate around Mach 2, the Marut in fact was barely capable of reaching Mach 1 due to the lack of suitably powerful engines.

The IAF were reluctant to procure a fighter aircraft only marginally superior to its existing fleet of British-built Hawker Hunters; however, in 1961, the Indian Government decided to procure 16 pre-production and 60 production Maruts. Only 147 aircraft, including 18 two-seat trainers, were completed out of a planned 214. After the Indian Government conducted its first nuclear tests at Pokhran, international pressure prevented the import of better engines, or at times, even spares for the Orpheus engines; this situation was one of the main reasons for the aircraft's early demise. The Marut never realised its full potential due to insufficient power. The Marut "was technically obsolete by the time it was first delivered in 1964". Other authors have also commented on the Marut's relative obsolescence by the time it reached production.

Termination and criticisms
The Marut was described as "essentially a very long-drawn-out failure", and the aircraft's shortcomings were considered to be due to multiple factors. Among these were the difficulties experienced in securing a suitable engine, which was principally a political issue; while arrangements were successfully established with the United Kingdom and Bristol Siddeley for HAL to domestically produce the Orpheus, it was only suitable as an interim measure as it lacked the power to enable the Marut to achieve supersonic speed. The Indian Government refused a proposal made by Rolls-Royce to finance further development of the Orpheus, which had been specifically aimed at producing a more suitable engine for the Marut.

Other envisioned alternative engines that might have been sourced from the Soviet Union, Egypt, or various European nations did not result in anything of substance. The Gas Turbine Research Establishment also pursued their own development program to improve the Orpheus without external aid, which proceeded to the testing phase with some favourable results, but proved incompatible with the Marut. As the particularities of a given airframe are typically heavily dependent on the engine used, the inability to improve the Marut's powerplant damaged its performance. Despite experimentation with various engines, the Marut was never able to achieve supersonic speeds, which was viewed as a major failure. IAF had anticipated the Marut being fitted with a considerably superior engine.

The project was negatively affected by a lack of direction and management from the Indian Ministry of Defence. A lack of coordination between the military, politicians, and industry is alleged to have been typical throughout the entirety of the programme, leaving many issues down to industry alone without guidance. Specifically, the government never sanctioned the development of an engine design team, nor were there assessments of HAL's capability to reverse engineer or to apply technologies from other projects, such as the work performed for the Folland Gnat. HAL is claimed to have struggled to convince both the IAF and MoD that the design of the Marut was acceptable; much attention was given to the unacceptably high level of trail drag the airframe produced, as well as dissatisfaction with the Marut's speed and manoeuvrability, both of which were below IAF specification upon the aircraft's introduction.

Tank had a major influence on the project, and accordingly of its shortcomings. While working on the Marut, he was criticized for a rigid stance on aspects of the design, and he typically had little interest in lobbying the Indian government for funding to refine the design. In addition, however, elements of the IAF have been alleged to have held dismissive attitudes toward Tank and of his abilities, rarely coordinated with him on issues with the aircraft, which in turn exacerbated the type's performance issues. The level of technological transfer between Germany and India on the project was subject to criticism as well.

Limitations within the Indian aerospace industry, which lacked the infrastructure and scientific base to successfully produce an effective indigenous combat aircraft at that time, forced a heavy reliance on foreign technologies and imported components. HAL's willingness to undertake overly-ambitious defence projects may also be partially responsible for the project's outcome. The Marut was not only heavily dependent on foreign-sourced materials, but was more expensive to manufacture the type in India than to have imported completed aircraft. The level of indigenous components increased over time, reportedly reaching 70 per cent by December 1973. The allocation of scarce resources to reproducing components that could have been readily imported represented a high level of opportunity cost to India.

The IAF reportedly showed little confidence or interest in indigenous fighter technology, having openly expressed its preference for the French-built Dassault Ouragan as an alternative. By the time the Marut entered mass production, the IAF had already purchased foreign-built fighters such as the Hawker Hunter and Sukhoi Su-7. Following on from the Marut, HAL proceeded to produce larger quantities of both European and Soviet combat aircraft under license, such as the SEPECAT Jaguar, Mikoyan-Gurevich MiG-21, and Mikoyan MiG-27.

Operational history

The Marut was used in combat in a ground attack role, where its safety features such as manual controls whenever the hydraulic systems failed, and twin engines, increased survivability. According to aviation author Pushpindar Singh, the Marut had excellent low-level flying characteristics, but its maneuverability suffered due to the lack of engine power; maintenance issues also resulted in the type being problematic in service.

In 1967, a single Marut was used as a testbed for the Egyptian indigenously-developed Brandner E-300 engine. The Indian team was recalled in July 1969, while the Egypt-based Marut was abandoned.

Given the limited number of Marut units, most Marut squadrons were considerably over-strength for the duration of their lives. According to Brian de Magray, at peak strength No.10 Squadron had on charge 32 Maruts, although the squadron probably did not hold a unit-establishment of more than 16. The Marut squadrons participated in the 1971 war and none were lost in air-to-air combat, although three were lost to ground fire, and one was destroyed on the ground. Three Marut pilots were awarded the Vir Chakra commendation.

Maruts constantly found themselves under heavy and concentrated fire from the ground during their low-level attack missions. On at least three occasions, Maruts regained their base after one engine had been lost to ground fire. On one of these, a Marut returned to base without escort on one engine, from about  inside hostile territory. On another occasion, a pilot flying his Marut through debris that erupted into the air as he strafed a convoy felt a heavy blow to the rear fuselage of the aircraft, the engine damage warning lights immediately illuminated, and one engine cut out. Fortunately, the Marut attained a safe and reasonable recovery speed on one engine. Consequently, the pilot had no difficulty in flying his crippled fighter back to base. Another safety factor was the automatic reversion to manual control in the event of a failure in the hydraulic flying control system, and there were several instances of Maruts being flown back from a sortie manually. The Marut had a good survivability record in enemy airspace.

In the Indo-Pakistani War of 1971, some Maruts and Hawker Hunter aircraft were used to give close support to an Indian border post in the decisive Battle of Longewala, on the morning of 5 December 1971. The aerial attack was credited with destroying a large number of tanks that had been deployed by Pakistani ground forces. More than 300 combat sorties were flown by the Maruts during a two-week period in the war.

According to Indian reports, one aerial kill was recorded as having been achieved by a Marut. On 7 December 1971, Squadron Leader KK Bakshi of No. 220 Squadron shot down a PAF F-86 Sabre (reportedly flown by Flying Officer Hamid Khwaja of No. 15 Squadron of the Pakistan Air Force), however according to Pakistani reports, the F-86F Sabre (Serial No. 4030) had suffered an Engine flameout while chasing an Indian Hawker Hunter over Khushalgarh.

By 1982, the IAF was proposing that the Marut fleet be phased out on the basis that the type was "no longer operationally viable". Supporters such as Air Commodore Jasjit Singh pointed out that the type had performed well in the 1971 combat, and had enjoyed superior safety records to other IAF aircraft such as the Gnat. Some aircraft had less than 100 recorded flight hours when the retirement of the Marut was being mooted.

Variants
HAL X-241A full scale research glider replicating the proposed production aircraft, with identical dimensions, control configuration and aerofoil sections.
Marut Mk.1 Single-seat ground-attack fighter.
Marut Mk.1A The third pre-production aircraft fitted with an afterburning Bristol Siddeley Orpheus 703 with 18% boost at  thrust.
Marut Mk.1 BXA single Mk.1 converted as a flying test-bed for the Brandner E-300 turbojet engine.
Marut Mk.1T Two-seat training version.
Marut Mk.1R Two HF-24s fitted with two afterburning Bristol Siddeley Orpheus 703s with 18% boost at  thrust.
Marut Mk.2A projected Rolls-Royce Turbomeca Adour powered derivative.

Former operators
 
 Indian Air Force
 No. 10 Squadron IAF
 No. 31 Squadron IAF
 No. 220 Squadron IAF – last unit with the type, relinquished aircraft mid-1990

Surviving aircraft

There are several surviving Maruts open to public inspection:
 Visvesvaraya Industrial and Technological Museum, Bangalore.
 HAL Museum, Bangalore
 Kamla Nehru Park, Pune.
 Nehru Science Centre, Mumbai.
 Periyar Science and Technology Centre, Chennai
 ASTE (Aircraft & Systems Testing Establishment), Bangalore
 Air Force Academy, Dundigul
 Deutsches Museum Flugwerft Schleissheim now on display at Museum für Luftfahrt und Technik Wernigerode
 Indian Air Force Museum, Palam

Specifications (Marut Mk.1)

See also

References

Citations

Bibliography

 Arnett, Eric H. Military Capacity and the Risk of War: China, India, Pakistan, and Iran. Oxford University Press, 1997. .
 "Maruta: India's Hindustan HF-24 Joins the IAF". Flight International, 2 July 1964, Vol. 86, No. 2886. pp. 16–17.
 Donald, David (editor). The Encyclopedia of World Aircraft. London:Aerospace, 1997. .
 Gupta, Amit. Building an Arsenal: The Evolution of Regional Power Force Structures. Greenwood Publishing Group, 1997. .
 Kumar, Satish. India's National Security: Annual Review 2013. Routledge, 2015. .
 Nordeen, Lon O. Air warfare in the missile age. Smithsonian Institution Press, 2002. .
 Rajagopalan, Swarna. Security and South Asia: Ideas, Institutions and Initiatives. Routledge, 2014. .
 Smith, Chris. India's Ad Hoc Arsenal: Direction Or Drift in Defence Policy? Oxford University Press, 1994. .
 Taylor, John W. R. Jane's All The World's Aircraft 1969–70. London:Jane's Yearbooks, 1969.
 Taylor, John W.R. (editor). Jane's All The World's Aircraft 1976–77. London:Jane's Yearbooks, 1976, .
 Thomas, Raju G.C. Indian Security Policy. Princeton University Press, 2014. .

External links

FAS page on HAL HF-24 Marut

Marut
1960s Indian fighter aircraft
Twinjets
Low-wing aircraft
Aircraft first flown in 1961